Elrington is a surname. Notable people with the surname include:

Charles Richard Elrington
Christopher Elrington, English historian
Thomas Elrington (disambiguation)
Wilfred Elrington (born 1948), Belizean politician
William Sandys Elrington (1780—1860), British military officer and colonial settler of New South Wales, Australia.

See also
Ellington (disambiguation)
Elkington (disambiguation)